A partial lunar eclipse took place on Saturday, July 15, 1916. The moon was strikingly shadowed in this deep partial eclipse which lasted 2 hours and 53 minutes, with 79% of the moon in darkness at maximum.

Observations
The Ross Sea party was a component of Sir Ernest Shackleton's Imperial Trans-Antarctic Expedition of 1914–17. Five men were stranded not far away from Cape Evans. There was sea ice between them and the relative safety of the hut on Cape Evans. On May 8 two of the men, Aeneas Mackintosh and Victor Hayward, decided to make an attempt to reach the hut. Soon after they set out, a blizzard hit. When the weather cleared up, the remaining men tried to look for them, but realized that the ice was far too thin to cross, and that their friends had been lost. Now they knew that they should wait for a thicker ice and for the full moon to attempt the crossing. Having the full moon was essential, because during polar night the moon is the only source of natural light other than the extremely dim light of the stars.

The weather did not cooperate during the full moon of June, but on July 15, everything seemed to be just right: calm weather, thick ice, clear skies and a full moon. The men started their journey in the morning. When the moon rose, however, the men were surprised to find it was about to be eclipsed. Ernest Wild wrote later:  
Although the eclipse continued for a few hours, the men were fortunate because it was only a partial eclipse. They reached Cape Evans later on the same day.

Visibility

Related eclipses

Lunar eclipses of 1915-1918

Half-Saros cycle
A lunar eclipse will be preceded and followed by solar eclipses by 9 years and 5.5 days (a half saros). This lunar eclipse is related to two annular solar eclipses of Solar Saros 125.

See also
List of lunar eclipses
List of 20th-century lunar eclipses

Notes

References
 The Monthly Evening Sky Map, Volumes 9-11 Partial Lunar Eclipse of July 14–15, 1916

External links

1916-07
1916 in science